The Institute of Sensory Organs is a research institute in Kajetany, Poland, established in 2008. Its legal form is presented by limited liability company.

Activity 
The main tasks are:
 designing, conducting and implementing the research and scientific works in the scope of prophylaxis, diagnosis, treatment and rehabilitation related to sense organ diseases
 conducting trainings and workshops.

Projects 
 development, testing and implementation of the Senses Organs Examination Platform software designed to conduct screening trials of hearing, sight and speech in children, youth and persons with particular education needs
 organising training workshops related to the modern otosurgery in the scope of hearing implants.

Awards 

2009
  Gold Medal with Menton - At the 58th International Exhibition of Innovation, Research and New Technologies “BRUSSELS INNOVA 2009”, City of Brussels

2010
 Award of the Minister of Science and Higher Education, Warsaw
 The title of the 2010 Innovation Leader for the solution “Senses Examination Platform”, Katowice
 Gold Medal at the 38th International “INVENTIONS GENEVA” Inventions Exchange, Geneva
 Special award of the Republic of Iran granted by the ISFAHAN UNIVERSITY OF TECHNOLOGY ROBOTIC CENTER at the 38th International Inventions Exhibition “INVENTIONS GENEVA”, Geneva
 Silver medal, Concours Lépine 2010, Paris
 Gold medal, 21st International Invention, Innovation and Technology Exhibition ITEX 2010, Kuala Lumpur
 Special prize of the Korea Invention Promotion Association at the 21st International Invention, Innovation and Technology Exhibition ITEX 2010, Kuala Lumpur
 Special prize of the Association „ Russian House for International Scientific Technological Cooperation” at the 21st International Invention, Innovation and Technology Exhibition ITEX 2010, Kuala Lumpur
 Gold medal, VI International Salon of Inventions and New Technologies “NEW TIME”, Sevastopol
 Silver medal, 6th Taipei International Invention Show & Technomart „INST 2010”, Taipei
 Gold medal, IV International Warsaw Invention Show „IWIS 2010”, Warsaw
 Gold medal, 62nd IENA Nuremberg International Trade Show – “Ideas-Inventions-New Products”, Nuremberg
 Special award of the "Taiwan Invention Association" at the Seoul International Invention Fair 2010, Seoul
 Gold medal at the International Inventions Fair,  Seoul
 Gold medal for the Home Rehabilitation Clinic, at the International Inventions Fair, Seoul
 Special prize for the Home Rehabilitation Clinic, awarded by the Association "Russian House for International Scientific and Technological Cooperation" at the International Inventions Fair, Seoul

2011
 Award of the Minister of Science and Higher Education, Warsaw

Cooperation 
 The Institute of Physiology and Pathology of Hearing
 Center of Hearing and Speech "MEDINCUS"

External links
 Institute of Sensory Organs

Medical research institutes in Poland
Pruszków County